PRAC may refer to:
 Pandemic Response Accountability Committee, to oversee funds distributed by the U.S. Coronavirus Aid, Relief, and Economic Security Act
 Probabilistic Action Cores, natural-language understanding software

praC may refer to:
 2-hydroxymuconate tautomerase, an enzyme

PrAc may refer to:
 Praseodymium(III) acetate, a chemical compound with informal formula PrAc.